The 2016 Southeastern Conference women's soccer season was the 214th season of women's varsity soccer in the conference.

The Florida Gators are both the defending regular season and tournament champions.

Changes from 2015 
 None

Teams

Stadia and locations

Regular season

Rankings

Postseason

SEC tournament

Bracket

NCAA tournament

All-SEC awards and teams

See also 
 2016 NCAA Division I women's soccer season
 2016 SEC Women's Soccer Tournament

References 

 
2016 NCAA Division I women's soccer season